Yevgeny Vladimirovich Ivanenko (born 22 December 1995) is a Belarusian professional footballer who plays for Slavia Mozyr.

Honours
Gomel
Belarusian Cup winner: 2021–22

References

External links 
 
 

1995 births
Living people
Belarusian footballers
Association football goalkeepers
FC Slavia Mozyr players
FC Khimik Svetlogorsk players
FC Granit Mikashevichi players
FC Gomel players